How the Daughter-in-Law Got the Coins is a Sri Lankan fairy tale collected by H. Parker in Village Folk-Tales of Ceylon.

It is Aarne–Thompson type 982, Ungrateful Heirs.

Synopsis
A man marries a rich woman who did not help his mother.  He gives his mother a bag full of pottery shards.  The mother contracts leprosy, but since she shakes the bags where the daughter-in-law can hear and announces that whoever cares for it will have, the daughter-in-law tends her.  After the mother dies, the woman realizes it was shards, not coins.

Variants
The tale is widespread, with many ways to trick the heirs into thinking there is wealth to be had.

References

Asian fairy tales
Sri Lankan literature
ATU 850-999